Three submarines and one frigate of the French Navy have borne the name Ariane:

 , a 40-gun frigate of the French Navy, lead ship of her class.
 , an  launched in 1914 and sunk in 1917.
 , an  launched in 1925 and scuttled in 1942.
 , an  launched in 1958 and struck in 1981.

French Navy ship names